Corona–West station is a Metrolink station in west Corona, California, on the 91 Line and Inland Empire–Orange County Line. Thirty-five Metrolink trains serve the station on weekdays.

The station is located at 155 S. Auto Center Drive, and has 504 parking spaces. Like all Metrolink stations in Riverside County, this station is owned by the Riverside County Transportation Commission.

Hours and frequency

References

External links 

Metrolink stations in Riverside County, California
Buildings and structures in Corona, California
Transportation in Corona, California
Railway stations in the United States opened in 1995